Böyük Əmili (also, Bëyuk Emili) is a village and municipality in the Qabala Rayon of Azerbaijan.  It has a population of 1,128.

References 

Populated places in Qabala District